Shearer Carroll West  is a British-American art-historian, academic and university administrator. West is currently the Vice-Chancellor of the University of Nottingham since October 2017 and formerly deputy vice-chancellor of the University of Sheffield.

West was appointed Commander of the Order of the British Empire (CBE) in the 2021 New Year Honours for services to education.

Biography and career
West holds an undergraduate degree in art history and English from the College of William & Mary, in Virginia, and a PhD in art history from the University of St Andrews.

She was previously head of the Humanities Division at the University of Oxford, director of research at the Arts and Humanities Research Council, and head of the School of Historical Studies at the University of Birmingham.

Selected publications
The Image of the Actor: Verbal and Visual Representation in the Age of Garrick and Kemble, Palgrave MacMillan, 1991. 
Fin De Siecle: Art and society in an age of uncertainty, The Overlook Press, 1994.
The visual arts in Germany 1897-1940: Utopia and Despair, Rutgers University Press, 2001. 
Portraiture, Oxford University Press, Oxford, 2004. (Oxford History of Art)

References

External links
 Biography at the University of Nottingham

Living people
Academics of the University of Birmingham
People associated with the University of Sheffield
Year of birth missing (living people)
College of William & Mary alumni
Alumni of the University of St Andrews
Academics of the University of Leicester
Fellows of the Royal Historical Society
British art historians
Vice-Chancellors of the University of Nottingham
Women heads of universities and colleges
American art historians
Commanders of the Order of the British Empire
American emigrants to England
Naturalised citizens of the United Kingdom